The Patrouille Suisse is an aerobatic team of the Swiss Air Force. The team flies six Northrop F-5E Tiger II fighter/bomber jets.

History

The Patrouille Suisse was founded on August 22, 1964 with four Hawker Hunters. Two displays were also flown 1968 with the Dassault Mirage IIIS under the name "Patrouille de Suisse Mirage". Other than those shows the Patrouille Suisse retained the Hunter. In 1970, a fifth aircraft was added to the team, followed by the sixth shortly thereafter. In 1977 a smoke system was introduced.

The Patrouille Suisse flew its Hawker Hunters for the last time in 1994 and transitioned to the faster and more maneuverable Northrop F-5E Tiger II adding smoke systems in 1996. In April the following year, a Pilatus PC-6 Porter single-engine turboprop light aircraft was assigned as a support aircraft, painted in the team's colour scheme.

In February 2013, the Swiss Minister of Defence, Ueli Maurer, stated that the Patrouille Suisse would be disbanded by early 2016 due to the withdrawal of the F-5 from service. One possible plan was to equip the team with the F/A-18C, but since the decision not to buy 22 Gripen E aircraft was made, the air force will have insufficient F/A-18s to do this.

As of the summer of 2014 the new plan is that by the end of 2016 the team will move from six F-5Es to four F/A-18Cs. Fewer air displays will be flown and the aircraft will probably not receive special paint. There are still plans by the Swiss Air Force and in the Swiss parliament to operate eighteen F-5E and four F-5F until 2018. This would also include the continued operation of the Patrouille Suisse flying the F-5E until 2018.
A unique Flight Demonstration was performed by the Patrouille Suisse on September 7, 2014 at the Air14 Air Show at Payerne Air Base as they flew a 15-plane display with the PC-7 Team.

Accidents 
On June 9, 2016 two of the Northrop F-5E Tiger II's collided in mid-air, while training for the Royal Netherlands Air Force Open Days airshow at Leeuwarden Air Base. One aircraft crashed in a pond near Beetgum after the pilot safely ejected, while the other was damaged, but landed safely. It was the first accident the team has had.

Aircraft

The Patrouille Suisse normally operates six Northrop F-5E Tiger II aircraft out of total of twelve F-5Es that are maintained in team colors. Since 1996 ten aircraft are able to accept one of the eight smoke generators that were made by RUAG. When fitted with a smoke generator, including the two  bottles of diesel, the right gun of the F-5E is disabled.

The teams F-5Es are also used for other purposes such as training and as target tugs flown by Target Squadron 12, facilitated by their high visibility colouring.

A Pilatus PC-6 V-622 "Felix", painted in Patrouille Suisse colours, transports the commander, announcer and the team groundcrew.

See also
PC-7 Team
Super Puma Display Team
Parachute Reconnaissance Company 17

References

External links

 Video of one Airbus A330 and six Northrop F-5E Tiger II aircraft at the Air14 airshow at Payerne.
Official website -  only
Patrouille Suisse photos
Teambook 2016  (German /English Text)with a list of all pilots since 1964

Swiss Air Force
Aerobatic teams
Military units and formations established in 1964
Articles containing video clips